Malcolm David Whitworth (1904 – 3 July 1950) was a British motorcycle racer who died in a crash at the 1950 350 cc Belgian Grand Prix.

Career
Denied the chance to race abroad by World War II, Whitworth competed in numerous races in the United Kingdom. In 1935 and 1936 he competed in the Manx Grand Prix, but retired both times. In 1937 he competed in the Isle of Man TT for the first time, which was thought at the time to be the toughest race in the world. In the 250 cc Lightweight TT race, he competed on a Cotton motorcycle but failed to finish. He failed to finish in 1938 as well, but in the 350 cc Junior TT he came sixth on a Velocette. In the 500 cc race at the Ulster Grand Prix he finished third, behind Jock West and Ginger Wood. In 1939 he finished fifth in the Junior TT and twelfth in the 500 cc Senior TT, in which he competed for the first time.

In the first post-war TT in 1947, Whitworth finished second to his teammate, Bob Foster, in the Junior TT, the best TT result of his career. He retired from the Senior TT race. In , Whitworth took part in the newly created World Championship. At both the Dutch TT and the Belgian Grand Prix, Whitworth finished fourth in the 350 cc class resulting in sixth place in the overall championship standings. Outside of the championship, Whitworth won the 350 cc race at the French Grand Prix in Saint-Gaudens.

In the  season, Whitworth took eleventh and nineteenth places in the Junior and Senior TT respectively. For the Senior TT, he competed for the first time as a works rider, for Triumph.

Fatal accident
On 2 July 1950, Whitworth competed in the 350 cc Belgian Grand Prix at Spa-Francorchamps. He was riding a privately entered Velocette and was in a fight for fifth place with Harold Daniell, Ted Frend and Charlie Salt. On the tenth lap, Whitworth and Salt came together, crashing heavily. Whitworth was taken to hospital where he was diagnosed with a skull fracture. The following day, Whitworth died in hospital from his injuries. In accordance with his wishes, which were to be buried close to the scene of any fatal accident he might have, he was buried in the local cemetery in Spa.

World Championship results
(key) (Races in bold indicate pole position; races in italics indicate fastest lap.)

External links
 David Whitworth profile at MotoGP.com
 M David Whitworth results at the Isle of Man TT database
 David Whitworth at MotorsportMemorial.org

1904 births
1950 deaths
English motorcycle racers
Motorcycle racers who died while racing
500cc World Championship riders
350cc World Championship riders
Sport deaths in Belgium